Close to the Sun is a first-person horror adventure video game developed by the Italian video game producer Storm in a Teacup and published by the British company Wired Productions. Developed using the Unreal Engine, the game was released on 2 May 2019 for Microsoft Windows and versions for the PlayStation 4, Xbox One and Nintendo Switch, ported by Warp Digital, were released on 29 October 2019. A version for Amazon Luna was made available on 5 December 2022.

In the game, the player guides a journalist named Rose Archer, who seeks to save her sister, Ada. Set in an alternate reality in 1897, the two prominent inventors Nikola Tesla and Thomas Edison fight for technological predominance on the globe. Close to the Sun almost exclusively takes place on the colossal sea cruiser "the Helios"; operated by Tesla, it serves as a hub for the world's most successful scientists and inventors.

The game was noted for its many similarities with the BioShock series. It received praise for its creative concept, its enthralling narrative, and its rich and imposing environment, but distaste for its rather mediocre to frustrating gameplay, especially when it comes to running away or solving puzzles.

Gameplay 
Close to the Sun is a horror adventure game played from a first-person perspective. During the span of 10 chapters, the gameplay consists of picking up keys to unlock doors, solving puzzles, and finding collectibles, all while getting an insight into the lives on the Helios. There are chase sequences, which happen at various points across the campaign. They require the players to press button prompts to jump over obstacles. While walking around, it can be noticed that the halls are filled with illuminated shadows, who appear to reenact scenes from the past.

Synopsis

Setting 
The game takes place in an alternate reality in 1897, in a technological war between Nikola Tesla, who was a Serbian-American inventor, electrical engineer, mechanical engineer, and futurist, best known for his contributions to the design of the modern alternating current (AC) electricity supply system in reality, and Thomas Edison, who was an American inventor and businessman, described as America's greatest inventor in reality.

While the tale starts on a small boat, the player spends the vast majority of time aboard the Helios, a gigantic retro-styled ocean liner named after the Hellenistic Sun God of the same name and serving as the "haven for the greatest scientific minds". The Helios is the world's largest ship, it chiefly consists of various private quarters and laboratories, furthermore it maintains an internal railway system, gardens, a theatre, a hospital, a cinema and many other facilities, including a Tesla Tower on its uppermost deck. The ship is owned and managed by the fictional company "Wardenclyffe", which is headed by Tesla; the company's name is inspired by that of the real Tesla Tower, officially called "Wardenclyffe Tower". The company is said to supply electricity to half of the world, but desires to supply the other half as well.

Much of the setting is expanded on in various documents, such as letters and newspapers that are scattered throughout the ship; These documents give a brief glimpse of the world the game is set in and some of the events that have taken place. These events include the political tensions between Tesla and various nations who see his massive wealth, ingenuity and resources as a threat along with the struggles that Tesla faces against the numerous spies working for Edison that have arrived on his ship.

Plot 
The game begins with Rose Archer arriving at the Helios after receiving a mysterious letter from her sister Ada, who was invited aboard the ship due to her renowned scientific research; The letter is enigmatic with Ada apologizing for leaving Rose quickly and telling her to come to the Helios. Included with the letter is a strange communication device. Rose boards the ship, but is puzzled to see that it appears empty. As she moves into the Lobby, she discovers the word "Quarantine" painted over the doors before they shut her inside.

Rose travels through the ship before being contacted by Ada through the communication device; Ada claims that she did not send any letter to Rose, despite the fact that the letter was in Ada's handwriting. The two sisters decide to try and meet together in Ada's dorm room. While heading to the room, Rose comes across several mutilated bodies of Helios Scientists. Additionally, the words, "Time is not a River" and "The Circle must be Broken" are scrawled everywhere, seemingly in blood. Ada reveals that there was an accident in one the experiments aboard the ship; The exact nature of the accident as well as who caused it, whether it was overconfidence or sabotage, is not explained. Ada only explains that the experiment had to do with Time, the One-Electron Theory, along with the fact that they were drawing the seemingly endless supply of electricity from time itself. While explaining this Ada also theorizes that a future version of herself sent the letter to Rose using the research she was developing on the Helios.

During these events, Rose has begun to see strange ghostly visions of people. These visions seem to be visions of the past; Of people going about their daily business before the accident. Rose also received a communication from a man called Aubrey, who is trapped in the Engine room and requests her help, but Rose only does not hid the fact that she will only help him after finding her sister. Aubrey shows clear signs of mental instability when he reveals that he talks to the dead body of a friend he calls, "Benny".

Ada finds herself trapped in the surgery room within the Biology labs by mysterious means and asks Rose to find one of her research note books which is hidden in Ada's dorm room. Rose finds the notebook, only to then be trapped within the dorm by Tesla who claims to be trying to manage the situation. Rose enlists Aubrey's help to move through the facility as his position within the engine room allows him to access various parts of the ship. In return, she promises to come and save him, after finding Ada. Aubrey agrees to the deal and opens the door for her. As Rose begins to leave the dorms, she comes across a deranged man butchering a scientist while muttering about breaking the circle. Aubrey calls him Ludwig and instructs Rose on how to escape through a nearby rail-station and onto a rail-car. However Ludwig sees Rose and begins to chase her; He shows knowledge of who she is and blames her for the current predicament, despite Rose having no prior knowledge of him. Rose eventually gets away from him.

The Rail-car eventually derails due to damaged parts of the track and Rose is forced to make her way to the biology labs on foot. As she travels, she comes across a strange blue mist that Aubrey calls "Exotic Energy" which is derived from the time-electricity experiments. She then witnesses two scientists being killed by a strange monster before the monster begins to chase her. Aubrey saves her by sealing the monster behind a door. He calls the monster a "Time Anomaly"  and describes them as Antibodies within Time, trying destroy an infection. However, they are only able to appear in the presence of Exotic Energy.

Rose finds herself near an observation deck to the Surgery room and is briefly reunited with Ada, however Exotic Energy begins to flood the room. Ada directs Rose to find her second notebook which contains the rest of her research which is hidden in the Theater, before she is killed by a Time Anomaly. Rose is broken by these events and initially wants to give up, but is incited to keep going by her promise to find all of Ada's research and to save Aubrey. Rose makes her way to the Theater where visions of Ada and Tesla direct her towards the second notebook. These visions also showcase the friendly relationship between the two.

Just as Rose finds the notebook, she is confronted by Ludwig once again. She manages to escape and, by accident, lures him over a weakened section of corridor that collapses under their weight and drops Ludwig into a massive fire. Rose then makes her way to the engine room to find Aubrey. After completing several puzzles, Rose arrives in the engine room only to be ambushed by Aubrey, who reveals that he was listening in on her conversations with Ada; He actually wanted Ada's research. He reveals that he was a well-regarded researcher before Ada arrived. Once she came on board, she took the spotlight with her groundbreaking work and he was demoted from his original post to the engine room. He further reveals that he was responsible for flooding the surgery room with Exotic Energy and causing Ada's death. His goal in this was to take Ada's research and seal the rift that is allowing the Time Anomalies to appear and come out of the event as the hero, thereby returning to Tesla's good graces. Rose, infuriated by this reveal, declares her intention to kill Aubrey. He runs away after this, leaving an injured Rose to face off against numerous Time Anomalies.

Rose is saved by Tesla who somehow manages to force the Time Anomalies away. He takes care of her while she is unconscious before leaving to try and stop Aubrey. Tesla believes that Ada's research is beyond Aubrey's knowledge and that he would only succeed in making the rift worse. He enlists Rose's help via the communicator when she wakes up to climb the Tesla Tower and confront Aubrey. As Rose makes her way to the tower, she comes across the Surgery Room but is shocked to see Ada's body is missing. She then has a vision of herself carrying Ada's body to a garden; An event that she has no memory of which implies that her visions are may be more than they seem.

Tesla's fears are proven true when Aubrey begins to divert power from various parts of the ship in an attempt to close the rift but is only exacerbating the event. Rose begins to ascend the tower and manages to distract Aubrey long enough for Tesla to arrive at the top and begin to fix the problem. However, just as Rose arrives, Ludwig also shows up, having survived the fire, albeit, severely wounded. He stabs Rose in the hand before killing Aubrey, while declaring his intention to break the circle. He tries to kill Tesla as well, but he is saved by Rose who activates the machinery around them to electrocute Ludwig. Tesla begins to work frantically, stating that the machinery is in critical state and directs Rose to escape with Ada's research.

Rose manages to flee the tower before it collapses. Tesla manages to contact her on the communicator revealing that he too survived by unknown means that he does not explain as there are "Too many variables". He directs Rose to his personal escape pod which is ejected from the ship as it sinks. The game ends on a cliffhanger with Rose in the pod, reading Ada's letter understanding the hidden meanings within it, before Tesla declares that Ada's research is key to everything and that using it they can undo everything and save her.

Reception 

Close to the Sun was met with "mixed or average" reviews, according to review aggregator Metacritic.

IGN reviewed the game positively, writing, "While the sometimes-obtuse puzzles and slow pacing can cause frustration and repetition, this is a harrowing and thoughtfully designed adventure from start to finish." Adventure Gamers praised the unique setting, visual design, voice acting, and alternate history backstory, while criticizing the slow movement speeds, lack of substantial player interaction, technical issues, and overreliance on jump scares and clunky chase scenes.

Push Square similarly awarded the PS4 port with 6 stars out of 10, appreciating the environment design, thick atmosphere, and intriguing setting while disliking the narrative climax and the game's inability to remain engaging.

Nintendo Life gave Switch port 5 stars out of 10 and loved the world and tense atmosphere but cited the technical sacrifices, poorly executed premise, and lack of scariness as major drawbacks. Nintendo World Report gave the port a 6 out of 10, lauding the art direction, jump scares, tense sequences, and engaging premise, and took issue with poor story execution, chase sequences, and the aliasing, object, texture pop-in, and framerate exclusive to the port.

References

External links 
 Official website

2019 video games
Adventure games
Alternate history video games
Fiction about diseases and disorders
First-person video games
PlayStation 4 games
Windows games
Xbox One games
2010s horror video games
Single-player video games
Video games developed in Italy
Cultural depictions of Thomas Edison
Unreal Engine games
Steampunk video games
Nintendo Switch games
Wired Productions games